Café Gijón (Also known as Gran Café de Gijón) is a culturally significant coffeehouse situated at No. 21, in the principal boulevard of central Madrid, Spain, which is known as Paseo de Recoletos. The café is opposite both a railway station of the same name and the National Library of Spain (BNE). The terrace in front is on the central walkway of the Paseo.

History
It was established on 15 May 1888 by Gumersindo Gómez (possibly Gunmersindo García).

Despite modest beginnings, after the Spanish Civil War it became a meeting-place for intellectuals, writers and artists collectively known as Generation of '36. It was also known by Hollywood stars and foreign writers such as Ava Gardner, Orson Welles, Joseph Cotten, George Sanders, and Truman Capote.

In December 2013, the cafe experienced a robbery.

Tertulias 
These were some of the more famous regular meetings or discussions:
 La tertulia de los poetas A Poets' Corner led by Gerardo Diego
 La juventud Creadora Creative Youth or Garcilasismo was one of the main currents of Spanish post-civil-war poetry
 La Tertulia de Escritores y Lectores  which was led by the Ateneo de Madrid a private cultural institution promoting scientific, literary and artistic talent, and loosely associated with the Institución Libre de Enseñanz movement which created the nearby Residencia de Estudiantes.

Famous Patrons

 Carlos Oroza
 Diego Medrano
 Francisco Umbral
 Juan Benet
 Eduardo Alfonso and Mario Rosso, founders of the Schola Philosophicae Initiationis
 Ramón María del Valle-Inclán
 Antonio Paso
 Alfonso Paso
 Antonio Buero Vallejo
 Antonio Gala
 Camilo José Cela
 Carlos Oroza
 Enrique Jardiel Poncela
 Fernando Fernán Gómez
 Gerardo Diego
 Juan José Cuadros Pérez
 Gloria Fuertes
 Ignacio Sánchez Mejías
 José Canalejas
 José Suárez Carreño
 Juan García Hortelano
 Santiago Ramón y Cajal
 Benito Pérez Galdós
 Modesto Ciruelos
 Dionisio Ridruejo
 José García Nieto
 Salvador Videgain García
 Manuel Alexandre
 Álvaro de Luna
 José Manuel Cervino
 Juan Van Halen
 Marino Gómez Santos
 José Luis Prado Nogueira
 Luis López Anglada
 Leopoldo de Luis
 Luis García Berlanga
 Arturo Pérez-Reverte

Café Gijón Prize
El Premio Café Gijón  is an annual Spanish literary award for an outstanding novel.

Although the award was originally managed by the Café Gijón, and is now financed by the tourism agency of the northern port city of Gijón in Asturias, it is only concerned with the spread of quality literature and the promotion of authors whose work may not otherwise be published for lack of funds. Although winners receive no financial prize, the award attracts considerable media attention which promotes both the winning authors and of course the sponsors of the prize.

References

External links
 Café Gijón official website

Buildings and structures in Madrid
Culture in Madrid
Food and drink companies based in Madrid
Coffeehouses and cafés in Spain